Jean-Pierre Simb (born 4 September 1974) is a French former professional footballer who played as a forward.

Career
Simb joined English Division Three side Torquay United in March 1999 from Red Star 93. 

He made his league debut at home to Hartlepool United on 27 March 1999 as a 17th-minute substitute for O'Neill Donaldson who went off with a broken leg that was to end his professional career. In the 37th minute Simb set off from just outside the penalty area on a run down the left wing. Eighty yards later, after a number of tricks, he was deep inside the Pool penalty-area. His cross was met by the head of Brian McGorry and fellow debutant, Eifion Williams was on hand to score Torquay's opener in a 3–0 win, with Williams scoring all three goals.

Simb's first goal for Torquay came a month later in a 2–0 win at home to promotion-chasing Rotherham United. Although popular with the fans for his trickery, it was not suited to the harsh realities of Third Division football and he spent much of the remainder of his time at Plainmoor on the substitutes' bench, before being released in February 2000.

External links
 
 

1974 births
Living people
French footballers
Footballers from Paris
Association football forwards
English Football League players
Red Star F.C. players
Torquay United F.C. players
French expatriate footballers
French expatriate sportspeople in England
Expatriate footballers in England